Song Yun-soo (born 10 December 1995) is a South Korean compound archer. She began learning archery in 2011 and made her international debut in 2015.

Career

She competed at the 2015 Summer Universiade games winning gold medals in the women's individual event and the mixed team event alongside Kim Jong-ho and a bronze medal in the women's team event alongside Kim Yun-hee and Seol Da-yeong. She also won two gold medals at the 2017 Summer Universiade games in the women's individual event and the women's team event alongside Kim Yun-hee and So Chaewon.

She participated at the 2017 World Archery Championships winning gold medals in the women's individual event and the mixed team event alongside Kim Jong-ho and a bronze medal in the women's team event alongside Choi Bo-min and So Chaewon.

In 2018, she won a gold medal at the Asian Games in the Women's team event alongside Choi Bo-min and So Chaewon.

References

Living people
South Korean female archers
Asian Games medalists in archery
Archers at the 2018 Asian Games
Medalists at the 2018 Asian Games
Asian Games gold medalists for South Korea
World Archery Championships medalists
Universiade medalists in archery
Universiade gold medalists for South Korea
Universiade bronze medalists for South Korea
Medalists at the 2015 Summer Universiade
Medalists at the 2017 Summer Universiade
Competitors at the 2017 World Games
21st-century South Korean women
1995 births